Bala Nagamma is a 1981 Indian Telugu- and Tamil-language film, directed by K. Shankar for A. Khader's K. B. Creations. The film stars Sarath Babu and Sridevi .

Plot 
Queen Punitha (Vennira Aadai Nirmala) prays to the goddess Nagadevi (K. R. Vijaya) to have a child as the kingdom has no heirs. The goddess offers her the choice of having a boy but losing her husband or having a girl and losing her own life. She chooses the latter and soon gives birth to a girl, Bala Nagamma. As she is dying, she asks Nagadevi to watch over her child. The king (S. A. Ashokan) is heart-broken but is convinced to remarry so his daughter can have a mother. He marries Mohana (Manjula) who plots to be rid of Bala Nagamma to secure her own power in the kingdom. She convinces the king that his daughter's horoscope means he will die if Bala Nagamma (Baby Anju) lives. The king is unable to kill his child but abandons her in the forest. Nagadevi takes the child and raises her. As an adult, Bala (Sridevi) meets king Vijayavarma (Sarath Babu) of a neighboring kingdom and the two soon marry. When Bala is pregnant, Vijayavarma leaves to subdue a group of bandits. He asks that Bala not cross the threshold of the palace while he's away. Bala gives birth to a son, Parthiban (Master Babu), while he's away. The evil magician Ranadeeran sees Bala when he asks to see the most beautiful woman in the world. Determined to have her, he tricks Bala into leaving the threshold of the palace and kidnaps her. Vijayavarma is also captured and transformed into a physically weak man when he tries to rescue her. Years pass and it falls to the young Partiban to rescue his parents with the help of Nagadevi.

Cast 
Sridevi as Bala Nagamma
K. R. Vijaya as Nagadevi
Sarath Babu as Vijayavarma
Master Babu as Parthiban
S. A. Ashokan as the king
Manju Bhargavi as Manju
Baby Anju as young Bala Nagamma
Vennira Aadai Nirmala as Puniavathi
Manjula as Mohana
V. S. Raghavan as Karunakaran
Ganthimathi as Panjavarnam
Moorthy as Sathinandham
Thengai Seenivasan
Manorama

Soundtrack
The soundtrack was composed by Ilaiyaraaja.

Tamil Soundtrack

Telugu Soundtrack

 "Kurulande Meghamvirishi..." - S. P. Balasubrahmanyam, Sasirekha
 "Sangeetha Maharani Nenu..." - Vani Jairam
 "Na Edalo Virisenamma Dola..." - S. P. Sailaja & P. Susheela
 "Manmadha Geethanjali..." - Vani Jairam
 "Malleteegara..." - S. P. Sailaja
 "Edi Raksha Vidhi..." - S. P. Balasubramanyam
 "Nemmadi Niratam..." - S. P. Sailaja
 "Saptasagramulu..." - S. P. Sailaja
 "Eekshanam Agni Bandhanam..." - S. P. Sailaja

References

External links 
 

1981 films
Films scored by Ilaiyaraaja
1980s Telugu-language films
Films directed by K. Shankar
1981 multilingual films
Indian multilingual films